The 1990 Trofeo Ilva-Coppa Mantegazza was a women's tennis tournament played on outdoor clay courts in Taranto, Italy that was part of the WTA Tier V category of the 1990 WTA Tour. It was the fourth edition of the tournament and was held from 1 May until 6 May 1990. First-seeded Raffaella Reggi won the singles title.

Finals

Singles
 Raffaella Reggi defeated  Alexia Dechaume 5–7, 6–0, 6–1
 It was Reggi's 1st singles title of the year and the 5th and last of her career.

Doubles
 Elena Brioukhovets /  Eugenia Maniokova defeated  Silvia Farina /  Rita Grande 7–6(7–4), 6–1

References

External links
 ITF tournament edition details
 Tournament draws

Mantegazza Cup
Ilva Trophy
1990 in Italian women's sport
1990 in Italian tennis